Yiyang High-Tech Industrial Development Zone (abbr: YYHTZ) is a national high-tech industrial zone in Yiyang, Hunan, China. It traces its origins to the former "Chaoyang Economic Development Zone", founded in 1994. It was renamed to the present name, meanwhile the zone was upgraded to one of first batch of provincial HTZs. In 2011, it became a national HTZs approved by the State Council of China. Its four major industries are new materials, new energy, advanced manufacturing and biomedicine.

References

External links
 

Economy of Yiyang
1994 establishments in China
Special Economic Zones of China